Norine Dorothy Braithwaite (born 1951), is a female former athlete who competed for England.

Athletics career
Norine Braithwaite is a former international athlete who represented Great Britain at 800 metres and 1,500 metres between 1970 and 1976.  She also competed for England in the 800 and 1,500 metres, at the 1970 British Commonwealth Games in Edinburgh, Scotland. Four years later she ran in the 1,500 metres at the 1974 British Commonwealth Games in Christchurch, New Zealand.

She also represented England in the 1973 IAAF World Cross Country Championships in Waregem, where she won a gold medal in the team event.

References

1951 births
English female middle-distance runners
Athletes (track and field) at the 1970 British Commonwealth Games
Living people
English female long-distance runners
Commonwealth Games competitors for England